Miguel Bedoya Sequeiros (born 15 April 1986) is a Spanish former professional footballer who played as an attacking midfielder.

Club career

Spain
Born in Madrid, Bedoya only played lower league and amateur football until the age of 25, representing local CF Rayo Majadahonda and Getafe CF B. He helped the latter team promote to the Segunda División B for the first time ever, in 2010.

On 23 May 2011, Bedoya joined CD Numancia on a three-year contract. He played his first game as a professional on 4 September of that year, coming on as a late substitute in a 0–0 away draw against Gimnàstic de Tarragona in the Segunda División.

In his last season in Soria, Bedoya started in 22 of his 31 appearances, helping to a final 13th position.

Bulgaria
On 8 July 2014, Bedoya signed a two-year deal with Bulgarian club PFC Levski Sofia. His first appearance in the First Professional Football League occurred 11 days later, as he started in a 1–1 home draw against PFC Lokomotiv Plovdiv. He scored his first goals for his new team on 27 September, his brace helping to a 3–2 derby defeat of PFC Ludogorets Razgrad at the Georgi Asparuhov Stadium.

Club statistics

References

External links
Levski Sofia profile

1986 births
Living people
Footballers from Madrid
Spanish footballers
Association football midfielders
Segunda División players
Segunda División B players
Tercera División players
CF Rayo Majadahonda players
Getafe CF B players
CD Numancia players
First Professional Football League (Bulgaria) players
PFC Levski Sofia players
Cypriot First Division players
Apollon Limassol FC players
Spanish expatriate footballers
Expatriate footballers in Bulgaria
Expatriate footballers in Cyprus
Spanish expatriate sportspeople in Bulgaria
Spanish expatriate sportspeople in Cyprus